is a role-playing video game for the Game Boy. The game was released by Konami in 1993, only in Japan. , an updated version of the game, was re-released in 1998 through the Nintendo Power service, adding Super Game Boy support, a bestiary for encountered monsters and additional story elements.

Story
A video gaming company was to release Phantom, their new RPG, but the company mysteriously is destroyed. Noah, Ken, and Miki are three RPG fans that are disappointed by this. Wandering about, they stumble upon a shack with a great demon inside, battling three warriors. The warriors are defeated and the demon exits through a portal. The warriors give their souls and powers to the three RPG fans, who now must enter Phantom to save the game's world. However, they must also protect the real world from the demon.

Gameplay
God Medicine features standard RPG elements. The three characters can level up through battle and equip weapons and armor. Spells can be learned, as well as Maphu attacks. After the party collects Maphu gems and gains the special Maphu weapons, they can put the gems in the weapons. Each gem has a different effect depending on what character equips it. Some Maphu attacks need to be charged during battle first. The charges last even if the battle is finished. The player can save anytime, except in battle.

Other Appearances
 Miki, Noah and Ken from God Medicine makes cameo in Ganbare Goemon 2: Kiteretsu Shougun Magginesu.
 Miki from God Medicine makes a brief cameo in the interactive game TwinBee PARADISE in Donburishima.

External links
JPgbx

1993 video games
Fantasy video games
Game Boy-only games
Japan-exclusive video games
Konami games
Role-playing video games
Game Boy games
Video games about video games
Video games about parallel universes
Video games developed in Japan